Háleygjatal is a skaldic poem by Eyvindr Skáldaspillir written towards the end of the 10th century to establish the Hlaðir dynasty as the social equals of the Hárfagri dynasty

The poem is only partially preserved in disjoint parts quoted in Skáldskaparmál, Heimskringla and two other manuscripts of kings' sagas. It appears to be a lesser imitation of Ynglingatal. Just like Ynglingatal it contains 27 generations (3 x 3 x 3), and some expressions appear to be borrowed from Ynglingatal. Moreover, it is composed in the same meter, kviðuháttr, and the theme seems to be to trace the lineage of the poet's patron to the gods.

A part of the poem quoted in Ynglinga saga mentions Odin and Skaði.

References

 Háleygjatal in Old Norse from heimskringla.no
 Lindow, John (2001). Handbook of Norse mythology. Santa Barbara: ABC-Clio. .
 Two editions of the poem in the original language
 Hans Hägerdal: Ynglingatal. Nya perspektiv på en kanske gammal text
 Háleygjatal Old Norse edition and English translation at The Skaldic Project

Skaldic poems
Sources of Norse mythology
Ladejarl dynasty